Jelastic is a cloud platform software vendor that provides multi-cloud Platform as a Service-based on container technology for hosting service providers, ISVs, telecommunication companies, enterprises and developers. The platform is available as public cloud in over 70 data centers, as well as virtual and on-premises servers. Jelastic provides support of Java, PHP, Ruby, Node.js, Python, Go environments, custom Docker containers and Kubernetes clusters.

Jelastic was co-founded by Ruslan Synytskyy, who also served as CEO.

Jelastic was acquired by Virtuozzo in 2021.

History
Jelastic was founded in 2011 as a public cloud company. Initially, it was a Platform as a Service specifically targeted on Java hosting. In 2012, the company received it to the Java Duke Choice Award.

From 2013 to 2015, the platform added support of PHP, Ruby, Python, Node.js, .NET and support of Docker containers. The latest runtime addition was in 2017 by integrating GoLang. In 2014, a private cloud solution was introduced, and by 2015, the platform could  be used as a hybrid and multi-cloud service.

Jelastic closed a set of funding rounds from Runa Capital, Almaz Capital Partners, Foresight Ventures and Maxfield Capital.

In June 2013, Jelastic announced the hiring of Mark Zbikowski, a former Microsoft architect and contributor to MS-DOS, as a senior adviser. In July 2013, Rasmus Lerdorf, creator of PHP, joined Jelastic as a senior adviser.

In November 2014, the creator of the Java programming language James Gosling and Bruno Souza joined the Jelastic team.

In 2018, Jelastic received Duke's Choice Award for the second time.

In 2021, Virtuozzo acquired Jelastic technology and business to offer First Full-Stack Cloud Management Solution for Service Providers. The acquisition comes after a 10-year partnership between the two companies.

Services

Supported Technologies
 Languages: Java, PHP, Ruby, Node.js, Python, .NET, Go
 Virtualization: Docker (software), Virtuozzo
 Load-Balancers: NGINX, Apache, HAProxy, Varnish, LiteSpeed
 Application Servers: Tomcat, LiteSpeed, GlassFish, Jetty, Payara, Apache, NGINX PHP, NGINX Ruby, SmartFoxServer, Railo, Spring Boot, TomEE, WildFly, JBoss
 Databases: MySQL, MariaDB, Percona, PostgreSQL, Redis, Neo4j, MongoDB, Apache Cassandra, CouchDB, OrientDB
 VPS: CentOS, Ubuntu, Windows VPS
 Additional: Maven, Memcached, Storage
 Integrated IDEs: IntelliJ IDEA, Eclipse, NetBeans

Installation
The platform can be installed on bare metal or any IaaS as public cloud, VPC, private on-premise, hybrid or multi-cloud.

Jelastic PaaS can be installed and fully configured by Jelastic Ops team, or this can be performed automatically on top of Google Cloud, MS Azure and Digital Ocean, as well as on top of bare metal using an ISO image.

The platform configuration includes integration with billing systems like WHMCS, Odin System Automation, Cleverbridge or custom billing if required.

Pricing Model
Jelastic provides a pay-as-you-use pricing model within public cloud. Resources are charged on an hourly base: RAM and CPU (cloudlet resource unit), Disk space, External traffic, Public IP and SSL. The price for each resource unit depends on the chosen hosting provider and can be estimated on a monthly, daily or hourly base within dev panel. Cloud hosting expenses can be tracked and optimized using built-in billing details for whole account or specific application.

Private cloud installation is charged monthly on a license base per physical server. There are two types of licensing - for installation with further self-administering and for installation with managed services.

Partnerships with service providers is built on a franchise model with revenue sharing.

Partners

Partners
Jelastic is installed by a wide range of hosting providers and telcos, among them are DataCenter Finland, Telecom Italia, eApps, infomaniak, PrimeTel, Elastx, innofield, CloudJiffy and others.

Customers 
Jelastic is used by system integrators and companies from different spheres (finance, software, sports, gaming etc.) like the International Football Association Board, GMV, G5 Games, Miele, Philips Lighting and others.

References

Cloud computing providers
Cloud infrastructure
Cloud platforms
Cloud storage
Software companies established in 2010
Technology companies established in 2010